is a Japanese football player.

Club statistics
Updated to 8 March 2018.

References

External links

1989 births
Living people
Association football people from Hokkaido
Japanese footballers
J1 League players
J2 League players
J3 League players
Japan Football League players
Hokkaido Consadole Sapporo players
Zweigen Kanazawa players
Fukushima United FC players
ReinMeer Aomori players
Nara Club players
Expatriate footballers in Thailand
Association football forwards